Gižiemiai (formerly) is a village in Kėdainiai district municipality, in Kaunas County, in central Lithuania. According to the 2011 census, the village was uninhabited.

Giežiemiai village and folwark has been mentioned at the end of the 19the century. It was an okolica (a property of the Dautartai family) at the beginning of the 20th century.

Demography

References

Villages in Kaunas County
Kėdainiai District Municipality